Silver Ridge is a long snow-covered ridge lying west of the mouth of Algie Glacier, being a prominent landmark on the north side of Nimrod Glacier in Antarctica. It was so named by the southern party of the New Zealand Geological Survey Antarctic Expedition (1960–61) because of the absence of rock on this steep-sided feature.

References
 

Ridges of the Ross Dependency
Shackleton Coast